The Move was one of ten Dance/Electronic music Commercial-free satellite channels operated by Sirius XM Radio, which in turn operated as part of XM Satellite Radio's five Dance/Electronic formatted offerings, broadcasting on channel 80.

Station history
The station played Pure Club and House music, mostly from the deeper and more underground aspects of the genre, along with extended remixes that wouldn't be appropriate on conventional, mainstream Dance radio. The channel featured club DJs and artists performing extended sets from time to time, including weekly shows from John Digweed, Louie Vega, Carl Cox, Paul Dailey, Charles Feelgood and Trattner & Galvan (The HiLo Allstars Radio Mix Show) . Until 2006, the channel included a Drum 'N Bass show called Pressure hosted by DJ Orbit.

The Move was removed from the XM satellite service on July 29, 2008 but continued to be available through XM Radio Online web streaming and on DirecTV channel 858. At the time, XM explained the suspension of the channel's over the air presence as temporary (to make room on the service for various specialty programming.) This was communicated by an audio loop heard on The Move's channel in place of normal programming and with text on the XM Radio web site; that the company "anticipate[d]" bringing back The Move in early 2009. However, The Move did not return to the satellites and there was speculation at the time of removal among subscribers and observers that XM programming executives had no intention of reinstating the channel despite the statement made in the announcements on-air and on the web site.

The final day for The Move, along with a number of other XM channels, was November 11, 2008. On November 12, 2008, the XM channel lineup was modified, with Sirius' Area occupying channel 80 on the XM lineup.

Artists: Barbara Tucker, Basement Jaxx, David Morales, Frankie Knuckles, Armand Van Helden, Axwell, Tiga, Bob Sinclar, Full Intention, Everything But The Girl, Kaskade, Mark Farina, Louie Vega, Charles Webster

Defunct radio stations in the United States
Radio stations established in 2001
Radio stations disestablished in 2008